The Trumpton Riots E.P. is a 1986 12" 45½rpm  vinyl EP by the English indie band Half Man Half Biscuit. The original release (TRUMP1) comprised the first four tracks listed below. A re-release later that year (TRUMX1) included the fifth one also.

 "The Trumpton Riots" 
 "Architecture, Morality, Ted and Alice" 
 "1966 and All That"
 "Albert Hammond Bootleg" 
 "All I Want for Christmas Is a Dukla Prague Away Kit" 

"The Trumpton Riots (Top 20 Mix)" and "All I Want For Christmas Is a Dukla Prague Away Kit" were released in 1986 on a 7" vinyl single (Probe Plus TRUM1-7"), before the release of the five-track EP.

The EP was incorporated into the 2003 re-release on CD of the album Back in the DHSS. There, the title of the second song is given as "Architecture and Morality Ted and Alice".

In a 2001 appreciation of the band, music writer and novelist Kevin Sampson described the EP as "utterly marvellous".

In May 2016, The Guardian newspaper reported that Gordon Murray's family were contemplating suing the band Radiohead for infringing the copyright of the idea of Trumptonshire in the video for their single "Burn the Witch". The same report noted that Half Man Half Biscuit's 1980s song "The Trumpton Riots" had "portrayed Trumptonshire as a place of striking firemen, militant socialism, and military coups".

Cultural references 
As is usual with Half Man Half Biscuit, the songs contain multiple cultural references, often obscure. Those identified include:
 "The Trumpton Riots" imagines a violent civil insurrection in Trumpton, a fictional town inhabited by stop-motion characters which featured in BBC TV children's programmes of 196669; the song also mentions several of the best-known characters in those programmes.
 The instrumental and hummed introduction is to the tune of "To Be a Pilgrim" ("He Who Would Valiant Be") by John Bunyan (162888) as arranged by the English classical composer Ralph Vaughan Williams (18721958), a popular hymn sung at the 2013 funeral of Margaret Thatcher (19252013)
 The song "He Who Would Valium Take" on the band's 1997 album Voyage to the Bottom of the Road refers to the same hymn
 "Cant conformism" puns on:
 cant, a jargon or argot of a group, often employed to exclude or mislead people outside that group
 Brian Cant (born 1933), narrator of the Trumpton programmes
 Immanuel Kant (17241804), German philosopher who argued that reason is the source of morality

 "Architecture and Morality Ted and Alice" combines the title of the 1981 album Architecture & Morality by Orchestral Manoeuvres in the Dark, and the title of the 1969 film Bob & Carol & Ted & Alice
 Diana, Princess of Wales (196197), English aristocrat
 Hannu Mikkola (19422021), Finnish rally driver
 Radio Dada, a name which combines the Dada surrealist movement and Radio Ga Ga, a 1984 song by the band Queen
 Jane Scott, a dating agency for the English upper class
 Miriam Stoppard (born 1937), British doctor, author, television presenter and advice columnist
 Albert Hammond (born 1944), English singer, songwriter and record producer raised in Gibraltar
 Robin Askwith (born 1950), English film actor
 Logie Baird (18881946), Scottish inventor known for his involvement in the development of television
 Club 18-30, a London-based holiday company that provides holidays for people aged 1735  in typical party island destinations (for example, San Antonio, Ibiza)
 DC-10, a three-engine wide-body jet passenger airliner which in its early years had a poor safety record
 Marseilles, a city and popular holiday destination on the French Riviera;  often called Marseille because there's no final 's' in the French name
 Stanley Rous (18951986), English football administrator
 "1966 and All That" alludes both to the comic misrepresentation of English history 1066 and All That by Sellar and Yeatman, and to the England national team's sole victory in a major international football competition, in the 1966 World Cup
 George Farm (19242004), Scottish footballer
 Gibraltar, a British Overseas Territory in the Iberian Peninsula; which according to legend, will remain under British rule so long as Barbary apes survive there
 Stanley Mortensen (192191), English footballer
 Ferenc Puskás (19272006), Hungarian footballer
 Bert Trautmann (19232013), German goalkeeper who played for Manchester City, and who famously continued playing in the 1956 FA Cup Final after suffering a broken neck
 Lev Yashin (192990), Russian goalkeeper
 The title "All I Want For Christmas Is a Dukla Prague Away Kit" alludes to both the 1944 novelty Christmas song "All I Want for Christmas Is My Two Front Teeth" by Donald Yetter Gardner (19132004), and to the 1963 novelty Christmas song "All I Want For Christmas Is a Beatle" by Dora Bryan (19232014)
 Away kit is sports clothing designed to distinguish the visiting team from the home team when similar team colours might confuse the players, spectators, and officials
 Dukla Prague, a football team from Prague (194896), whose away kit consisted of yellow stockings, red shorts, and a yellow shirt with non-detachable red sleeves. In 2001, FK Dukla Prague adopted the name of that by-then-disbanded club; their away kit is all red, but also has non-detachable sleeves
 Giro, a British slang name for a welfare cheque
 Scalextric, a slot car racing game
 Subbuteo, a tabletop game simulating a variety of sports; in this case, association football

References

External links 
 The longest-established Half Man Half Biscuit fan site
 The Half Man Half Biscuit Lyrics Project

1986 debut EPs
Half Man Half Biscuit albums
UK Independent Singles Chart number-one singles